The Lahore Marathon is an annual road marathon held in Lahore, Pakistan on 2005, 2006, and 2012.  The main event is the traditional 42.195 km marathon race. Other races in the marathon include a 10 km race, 5 km "Family Fun Run", and 3 km races for people with physical and visual impairment. The marathon is preceded by a gala dinner for international athletes, foreign dignitaries, government and corporate leaders. Approximately 26,000 people participated in the Lahore Marathon in total in 2007, making it one of the major marathons of the world.

History
The inaugural marathon took place on 30 January 2005, with over 60 elite runners participating in a field of 17,500. Tseko Mpolokeng of South Africa was the first winner of the competition, with a time of 2:16:57. The first Pakistani to cross the finish line was Mohammad Aslam. Jane Kariuki of Kenya was the first winner of the women's division.

The second running of the marathon took place on 29 January 2006. The 2007 edition took place on 14 January 2007.

The course
The 42 km traditional marathon is a closed circuit which begins and ends at the gates of Gaddafi Stadium in Gulberg.

Runners begin by crossing the Ferozepur Road bridge and pass the historic districts of Ichhra and Mozang before reaching Chauburji. The course passes the Data Durbar Complex and approaches the half way stage, where it loops back towards the finish line in between Minar-e-Pakistan and Lahore Fort. Runners run alongside the famous Badshahi Masjid and pass the Bhati Gate and Taksali Gate of the Walled City of Lahore. The course then runs through The Mall, passing several notable sites such as Lahore Museum, Kim's Gun, and Bagh-e-Jinnah. The route turns onto Canal Road and makes a loop around Kalma Chowk, before finishing at the gates of Gaddafi Stadium.

Results
This is a list of the winners of the Lahore Marathon.

Men's race

Women's race

Wheel chair race

Tricycle race

References

External links
 LaborPakistan.org - 'Marathon for Civil Liberties', Farooq Sulehria, Pakistan Labor Party

Recurring sporting events established in 2005
Marathons in Pakistan
Lahore
International sports competitions hosted by Pakistan
Sport in Lahore
2005 establishments in Pakistan